Vesyolaya Griva is a rural locality (a selo) in Yevpraksinsky Selsoviet, Privolzhsky District, Astrakhan Oblast, Russia. The population was 290 as of 2010. There are 5 streets.

Geography 
Vesyolaya Griva is located 34 km south of Nachalovo (the district's administrative centre) by road. Semibugry is the nearest rural locality.

References 

Rural localities in Privolzhsky District, Astrakhan Oblast